Lacinipolia triplehorni is a species of cutworm (also called dart moths) in the family Noctuidae. It is found in North America.

The MONA (Moths of North America) or Hodges number for Lacinipolia triplehorni is 10403.1.

References

Further reading

 
 
 
 
 

Eriopygini